Cycloramphus stejnegeri is a species of frog in the family Cycloramphidae. It is endemic to the Serra dos Órgãos in southeastern Brazil. The specific name stejnegeri honors Leonhard Stejneger, a Norwegian–American herpetologist and ornithologist. Common name Stejneger's button frog has been coined for this species.

Description
Adult males measure  and adult females  in snout–vent length. The snout is rounded or vertically sloping in profile. The toes have no webbing nor fringes. The dorsum is smooth or granular, usually having regular dorsal ridges. Coloration is non-distinctive and the dorsum may be uniform or have chevron-like markings. The posterior surface of the thigh has small or larger distinct light spots.

Habitat and conservation
It is usually found under leaf litter but sometimes also in burrows. The eggs are deposited under leaf litter in burrows or under logs; the tadpoles are terrestrial and live away from water.

Cycloramphus stejnegeri is an uncommon species that has not been recorded from disturbed habitats. Major threats to it are unknown. The range is within the Serra dos Órgãos National Park.

References 

stejnegeri
Endemic fauna of Brazil
Amphibians of Brazil
Amphibians described in 1924
Taxa named by Gladwyn Kingsley Noble
Taxonomy articles created by Polbot